Showqabad may refer to:
 Showqabad, Hamadan
 Showqabad, Rigan, Kerman Province
 Showqabad, North Khorasan